Planochloris is a genus of green algae, in the family Sphaerocystidaceae. Its sole species is Planochloris pyrenoidifera.

References

External links

Scientific references

Scientific databases
 AlgaTerra database
 Index Nominum Genericorum

Chlamydomonadales genera
Chlamydomonadales
Monotypic algae genera